Dignity is the fourth studio album by American recording artist Hilary Duff. It was released on March 21, 2007, by Hollywood Records. After launching her third studio album  Hilary Duff (2004), she experienced an eventful personal life, including a stalking incident, her parents getting divorced and her breakup with her boyfriend Joel Madden after two years of dating. Consequently, Duff assumed an integral position in its production, co-writing almost every track with longtime collaborator Kara DioGuardi instead of her previously-limited involvement.

In contrast to the pop rock themes of her prior releases, Dignity takes on more of a dance sound, which she said was not her intention while writing the album. The lyrics reference the events Duff experienced in the years leading to the album's release, and the album's songs contain influences of rock and roll and hip hop music.

Critical response was mostly positive; the album was praised for its songwriting and her new musical direction. Upon release, Dignity debuted at number three on the US Billboard 200, a lower peak than Duff's previous albums and with lower sales, which Billboard attributed to the loss of fans during her musical evolution. Despite this, it produced Duff's highest-peaking single on US Billboard Hot 100 to date, "With Love", which peaked at number twenty-four, and two number one club hits on US Hot Dance Club Play. The album has reached the top ten in several countries and was certified Gold in the United States by the Recording Industry Association of America (RIAA). To promote the album, Duff embarked on her fourth concert tour, the Dignity Tour, between July 2007 and February 2008.

Background 
Duff's previous studio album, the self-titled Hilary Duff (2004), received generally negative reviews. The album peaked at number two on the Billboard 200, and its commercial performance was still successful: it exited the chart after 33 weeks and sold 1.8 million copies in the United States.

Between the releases of Hilary Duff and Dignity, Duff's personal life was eventful. In October 2006, she and her boyfriend at the time, Joel Madden of punk rock band Good Charlotte, claimed that they were being stalked by Russian emigre Maksim Miakovsky and his roommate, paparazzo David Joseph Klein. According to a restraining order filed by Duff, Miakovsky came to the United States solely to pursue a relationship with her. He was later arrested after threatening to kill her. In November, she ended her two-year relationship with Madden. Around the same time, her parents Robert and Susan separated after 22 years of marriage following an affair between Robert and another woman.

Writing and development 
Duff explained of the album's title, "I'm older and more mature now than I was when I made my last record, but I don't think I know it all. Having dignity is something you work on your whole life, in how you treat people and how you treat yourself. I hope I always strive to have it." She continued, "It's not something that you can be given or that you can just get or that you're born with. It's something that you have to work on."
She stated that with Dignity, her increased songwriting output was a breakthrough for her. "That hadn't really been part of my process on previous records, except here and there. It was important this time," she said. She co-wrote all of the album's songs, with the exception of "Outside of You", written by Pink, Chantal Kreviazuk and Raine Maida. In an interview, Maida stated that the song was written for a Pink album but did not make the final cut. When Duff expressed interest in the song, she recorded it. Duff explained of her writing process:

[The album] has all of me in it. I never did my records like that before. I got to choose the music, but this time around it was, like, I'd sit down and think: 'What happened to me yesterday? What happened to me today?' and just write. It was very therapeutic, in a way. And easy – I was shocked at how easy it was to be honest about yourself and things that affect you. It is a dance record, but I wanted it to be serious. I wanted to talk about serious things, but do it in a not-so-serious way, with music that makes you want to get up and dance.

Much of Dignity was written in Duff's own home, as she felt "comfortable and free" there. She said that she knew from the beginning that she wanted to write the album with the assistance of songwriter and producer Kara DioGuardi, due to their previous work history on songs such as "Come Clean" and "Fly". Another reason that Duff wished to work with her was that she found her lyrics were complemented by DioGuardi's melodies. She added, "I helped with the melodies, but that's not my strongest suit. Coming up with the lyrics was mainly [what I did]. I'd tell her this is how I want it to go, and she would help with the lyrics, too, sometimes. She'd say, 'This doesn't really fit,' and if I was adamant, we'd make it work."

Composition 
As inspiration for the album, Duff cited indie rock band the Faint and pop singers such as Gwen Stefani and Beyoncé, while critics compared her musical style with Stefani, Janet Jackson, Depeche Mode, Madonna and Justin Timberlake. Duff felt that the album's dance-pop themes were a deviation from the pop rock of her previous albums. "I didn't necessarily plan the album to sound like this, but it was so easy to write to," she said. Critics have noted that Dignity'''s musical style is dance-pop and electropop, with influences of hip hop, rock and roll and Middle Eastern music. According to Duff, the album is a combination of dance, electro and rock music.

The lyrics of several songs relate to Duff's experiences between the releases of Hilary Duff and Dignity. The songs "Stranger" and "Gypsy Woman", despite speculation that they were written about Madden's then-new girlfriend Nicole Richie, were actually written about Duff's father's affair. She said that "Stranger" was written from her mother's perspective. "Stranger is a song I wrote about how my mom must feel around my dad," she said. "I made it seem like it was about a relationship I was in, because I didn't want people to know about my parents. But I've realized that so many people can relate to what I've gone through." The album's title track has also been reported to be about Richie, though Duff did not deny rumors that it was. "Dignity is a song that is definitely about people in Hollywood", she said. "I wouldn't say that it is about her specifically but it is about people that kind of do what she does and act the way she acts." The song "Danger" was written about one of Duff's friends' relationships with an older man. "I understand that feeling of wanting to be dangerous," she said. "You may know morally something's not right, but you can't help yourself." She has stated that the song "Dreamer" was written about a stalker in a tongue-in-cheek fashion, and it has been speculated that it was written specifically about Miakovsky.

 Artwork 
The album's photography was done by Andrew Macpherson, in which a "newly brunette Duff wears grown-up black leather and diamonds," in line with its theme of "reinvention". The album artwork is a tightly framed portrait of Duff, with Stephen Thomas Erlewine of AllMusic opining: "From the soft-focused, impeccably styled, tasteful cover photo–better suited for Harper's Bazaar than a pop album [...] Dignity, appears to be the teen star's self-styled, self-conscious adult album. Almost too adult, actually, since the packaging makes it seem like Hilary skipped over her wild, restless years and headed straight toward polished adult contemporary blandness."

When asked by Westword if the artwork is a comment on how other celebrities should present themselves in the media, Duff stated: "The record cover is a big closeup of my face. It’s not like I have no clothes on or I’m trying to do something really edgy or provocative. [...] It’s not about anybody else. It’s my record and I would not ever want to try and make someone like me or say this is how you should be. I’m just saying this is how I am and this is how I want to be." Its artwork for the Japanese release was done by Leslie Kee, who captured her youthful appearance and "sexy" side as she transitioned into adulthood.

 Promotion 

To promote the album's release, Duff "worked tirelessly with the whole Hollywood Records staff to market [the] record." On the day of the album's release, April 3, MTV began airing the two-part documentary special, Hilary Duff: This Is Now. The documentary followed Duff as she prepared for the release of Dignity by attending photoshoots, interviews, wardrobe fittings, rehearsals and a trip to Europe. In addition, Duff hosted Total Request Live for the week of March 26, made several appearances at retail outlets and on television, and was given massive online coverage on MySpace and Yahoo!.

Accompanying Duff's new musical style, the record label began promoting her with a more mature image. Duff dyed her hair dark and "sexed-up" her image. According to Duff, she wanted to "try new things", but the image change "just happened. It is not like a conscious change. People think it is so different because they have watched me grow up but that is just what happens in life." Entertainment Weekly described Duff's new look as comprising "dark mane, dental veneers, luxe and vampy fashions". In mid-2007, concurrent to the preparation of the radio release of "Stranger", Duff was featured on the July covers of the magazines Us Weekly and Shape in a bikini, and on the August cover of Maxim accompanied by the declaration that she had gone "from the queen of teen to breakout sex symbol". The Associated Press wrote that Duff's more provocative image would help her singles to garner mainstream radio play. Guy Zapoleon, a radio consultant and former programmer for Top 40 radio, explained that "radio has a stigma about playing [Disney] acts, considering them teen and preteen in their appeal", and that Duff's provocative image would "definitely have a positive effect on the attitude of programmers, who are mostly male, as Disney tries to mature her image". A bonus EP containing five bonus remixes was released exclusively to US Walmart stores as a package with the album.

 Singles 
Three singles were released from the album. "Play with Fire" was released as the first single on August 21, 2006 which Duff considered to be a "tease" of Dignitys musical sound. Although she felt it was different from the album's other songs, she saw it as embodying the dance/electro/rock combination of the album, which influenced her decision to release it. Duff opted to release the song well in advance of the album "to give listeners a chance to get into my new sound". Though it failed to chart on the Billboard Hot 100, it charted on the magazine's Hot Dance Club Play chart, peaking at number 34. It was later released as a digital-only single on May 15, 2007 in a remixed form of the original version, with production by Richard Vission. The second single, "With Love" became her highest-peaking single on the Hot 100 when it reached number 24. The single reached number one on the Hot Dance Club Play chart. The third and final single, "Stranger", peaked at 97 on the Hot 100 and also reached the top of the dance charts.

 Tour 
To further promote the album, Duff embarked on her fourth concert tour, the Dignity Tour. Tickets for most of the leg sold out prior to the show. The tour began in Los Angeles, California on July 28, 2007, and closed in Melbourne, Australia on February 3, 2008. During the tour, Duff premiered a new song, "Reach Out", which was originally intended to be featured on a planned re-release of Dignity. The re-release never came to be, but the song was ultimately released on Duff's greatest hits album Best of Hilary Duff (2008).

Filming for the concert took place at Gibson Amphitheatre on August 15, 2007, and was exclusively released via the U.S. iTunes Store in 2010.

 Critical reception 

The critical response to Dignity was generally positive. Metacritic gave the album a Metascore—a weighted average based on the impressions of a select 13 critical reviews—of 61, signifying generally favorable reviews. Rolling Stone gave a positive review of the album, feeling that Duff's attempt to make an adult-oriented dance-pop album was successful. About.com gave the album four out of five stars, called Duff "as likeable as ever" and praised the songwriting and production contributions of Richard Vission and will.i.am. Allmusic noted that the album was firmly based on "sturdy, hooky, and memorable" songwriting. The review claimed similarities between Dignity and Justin Timberlake's FutureSex/LoveSounds (2006), noting that Duff was musically fashionable but not a trendsetter. At the same time, the review criticized Duff's thin vocals, calling them "not at all like a woman". Billboard called Duff's decision to make a dance-pop album daring, considering the unpopularity of the genre at the time. The review continued, "It's practically something straight out of the United Kingdom for all of its poppy goodness." Entertainment Weekly noted that Duff's break-up with Madden brought out her personality, which the magazine felt was lacking in her previous work. "She's never sounded less eager to please or more messily human," the review claimed.

The Guardian praised Duff's decision to opt for a more electronic dance sound as opposed to the teen pop of her previous work, despite the questionable marketability. They argued that some of the album's strongest tracks rivaled some by Kylie Minogue.  Sputnikmusic's review noted various flaws of the album, such as what they felt were a lackluster guitar solo on the song "I Wish" and Duff's childish, uncharacterized vocals throughout. However, they continued, "For all its inadequacies, Dignity is a solid, constructed pop album. Like all albums of the genre not written solely by the performer, it's never quite clear which parts, if any, are Duff's words and which represent the feelings of the under-appreciated co-writer, but in Dignity we at least have an album where it's worthwhile listening to the lyrics." They praised the songwriting of every track except "Play with Fire", which they felt was a poor choice for a lead single.

IGN gave a more mixed review of Dignity, giving it 6.9 out of 10. They praised what they felt was Duff's more mature image, but ultimately claimed, "Duff is still Duff and her music is still running the standard pop line." PopMatters noted that the synthesizers used on the album's tracks failed to disguise Duff's speak-singing. The website believed her vocals were not on the level of her pop music peers such as Kelly Clarkson and Mandy Moore. "Nevertheless," they added, "thanks to the miracle of processing, reverb effects, and multi-tracking tricks to beef up her vocals, Duff's voice is still sweetly candy-coated enough to make the medicine go down." Slant Magazine said, "Duff is mostly just an anonymous voice for an assemblage of producers and songwriters. Which is perfectly acceptable for a self-proclaimed dance album, but Duff's voice is nondescript and her delivery is blank; the impish, quirky, or coolly disaffected vocal characteristics and sex appeal that make other dance-pop divas viable performers is nonexistent." The website's review claimed that the album was not very adventurous, and noted that the pop rock "Outside of You", which they felt was the catchiest song on Dignity, was not a dance song like the others.

 Commercial performance 
Dignity debuted at number three on the US Billboard 200, selling 140,000 copies in its first week. The debut was lower than those of Duff's previous albums, each of which entered at either number one or two with opening week sales of around 200,000 copies. Billboard wrote that Duff's "continued evolution in sound and image ... may have resulted in her losing some of her much younger fans." The album has sold a total of 412,000 copies in the US by June, 2015. The album debuted at number twenty-five in the UK with first-week sales of over 8,000 copies. The album spent three weeks in the top seventy-five of the UK Albums Chart. Dignity broke Duff's streak of consecutive number-one debuts in Canada, entering the albums chart at number three with 20,000 copies sold. In response, Duff said she "couldn't be happier" and felt lucky that Dignity sold the amount it did, noting the state of the marketplace and the moderate sales figures for other albums that week. The album debuted at number seventeen on the ARIA Albums Chart in Australia, selling roughly 2,300 copies in its first week. The Herald Sun referred to it as "dead in the water" in its second week on the chart. In Italy, Dignity received a Gold certification from the FIMI for shipments to stores of more than 40,000 copies.

 Track listing Notes' signifies an additional producer
 signifies a co-producer
 signifies a remixer

Personnel 
Credits for Dignity'' adapted from Allmusic.

 Chico Bennett – producer
 Mateo Camargo – producer
 Kara DioGuardi – producer
 Hilary Duff – executive producer, lead and backing vocalist
 Víctor González – producer
 Tim & Bob – producer
 Jason Groucott – mixing
 Derrick Harvin – producer
 Richard "Segal" Huredia – mixing
 Alain Johannes – mixing
 Enny Joo – art direction and design
 Rhett Lawrence – producer, mixing

 Logic – producer, mixing
 Raine Maida – producer
 Manny Marroquin – mixing
 Andrew McPherson – photography
 Fredwreck – producer, mixing
 Vada Nobles – producer, mixing
 Andre Recke – executive producer, A&R, management
 Dave Snow – creative director
 Ryan Tedder – producer
 Richard Vission – producer
 Greg Wells – producer
 will.i.am – composer

Charts

Weekly charts

Year-end charts

Certifications

Release history

References

2007 albums
Hilary Duff albums
Albums produced by Chico Bennett
Albums produced by Fredwreck
Albums produced by Greg Wells
Albums produced by Raine Maida
Albums produced by Ryan Tedder
Albums produced by Tim & Bob
Hollywood Records albums
Electropop albums